The 1961 Atlantic Coast Conference men's basketball tournament was held in Raleigh, North Carolina, at Reynolds Coliseum from March 2–4, 1961. Wake Forest defeated Duke, 96–81, to win the championship. Len Chappell of Wake Forest was named tournament MVP. 

 did not participate because the program was on NCAA probation. As a result, top seed Wake Forest received a first-round bye.

Bracket

Tournament
ACC men's basketball tournament
College basketball tournaments in North Carolina
Basketball competitions in Raleigh, North Carolina
ACC men's basketball tournament
20th century in Raleigh, North Carolina